Makabi Lilepo(born 27 July 1997)is a professional footballer who plays for Al-Hilal Club (Omdurman) of the Sudan Premier League, and the Democratic Republic of the Congo

Club career 
Lilepo came up from the youth ranks of AS Vita Club but never made it into the first team or saw any Linafoot playing time. In late 2018 he was invited to trials at Zamalek SC of the Egyptian Premier League. In January 2019, after a two-month wait for the paperwork to be finalized, he was loaned to Mbabane Swallows for the 2018–19 Eswatini Premier League season. Halfway through the 2019–20 Linafoot season, Lilepo joined FC Renaissance du Congo. He made an immediate impact scoring four goals in his first seven matches with the club. By 2021 Lilepo had returned to AS Vita and appeared for the club in the 2020–21 CAF Champions League.

International career 
Lilepo made his senior international debut on 17 January 2021 in a 2020 African Nations Championship match against the Congo. Thirteen days later he scored his first senior international goal against Cameroon in a quarter-final match of the same tournament.

International goals
Scores and results list DR Congo's goal tally first.

International career statistics

References

External links 
National Football Teams profile
Soccerway profile

1997 births
Living people
Democratic Republic of the Congo footballers
Democratic Republic of the Congo international footballers
Association football midfielders
Linafoot players
Expatriate footballers in Eswatini
21st-century Democratic Republic of the Congo people
Democratic Republic of the Congo A' international footballers
2020 African Nations Championship players
Democratic Republic of the Congo expatriate sportspeople in Eswatini
Democratic Republic of the Congo expatriate footballers
Expatriate footballers in Sudan
Democratic Republic of the Congo expatriate sportspeople in Sudan
AS Vita Club players
Al-Hilal Club (Omdurman) players